The following is the order of precedence in England and Wales as of  . Separate orders exist for men and women.

Names in italics indicate that these people rank elsewhere—either higher in that table of precedence or in the table for the other sex. Titles in italics indicate the same thing for their holders, or that they are vacant.

Peers and their families make up a large part of these tables. It is possible for a peer to hold more than one title of nobility, and these may belong to different ranks and peerages. A peer derives his precedence from his highest-ranking title; peeresses derive their precedence in the same way, whether they hold their highest-ranking title in their own right or by marriage. The ranks in the tables refer to peers rather than titles: if exceptions are named for a rank, these do not include peers of a higher rank (or any peers at all, in the case of baronets). No exceptions are named for most categories, owing to their large size.

Men

Royalty, archbishops, et al.

Royal family
Precedence is accorded to spouses, children and grandchildren of the reigning sovereign, as well as children and grandchildren of former sovereigns.

Archbishops, High Officers of State, et al.

Nobility, bishops, et al.

Dukes, et al.

Marquesses, et al.

Earls, et al.

Viscounts, et al.

Bishops

Barons/Lords of Parliament

Gentry, et al.

Master of the Rolls and Supreme Court Justices

Royal Household officials

Cabinet, et al.

The Prime Minister determines the order of precedence for Secretaries of State as part of the ministerial ranking (also known as the order of precedence in Cabinet).

Knights of the Garter and Knights of the Thistle

Privy Counsellors, et al.

Senior judges, et al.

Baronets

Knights

Lower level judges, et al.

Other lower ranks, including esquires and gentlemen

Companions, commanders, lieutenants and officers of various orders

Eldest sons of various grades

Members of various orders

Younger sons of various grades

Women

Royal Family
The order of precedence accorded to women of the royal family:

High Officers of State, et al.

Nobility and bishops

Duchesses, et al.

Marchionesses, et al.

Countesses, et al.

Viscountesses, et al.

Female bishops

Baronesses

Gentry, et al.

Supreme Court Justices

Royal Household officials

Cabinet, et al.

The Prime Minister determines the order of precedence for Secretaries of State as part of the ministerial ranking (also known as the order of precedence in Cabinet).

Ladies and dames, et al.

Ladies of the Garter and Ladies of the Thistle

Wives of Knights of the Garter

Wives of Knights of the Thistle

Privy Counsellors, et al.

Senior judges, et al.

Dames

Lower level judges

Members of orders, et al.
 Companions of orders
 Companions of the Order of the Bath
 Companions of the Order of St Michael and St George
 Commanders of the Royal Victorian Order
 Commanders of the Order of the British Empire
 Wives of Companions of the following Orders:
 Order of the Bath
 Order of the Star of India
 Order of St Michael and St George
 Order of the Indian Empire
 Royal Victorian Order
 Order of the British Empire
 Wives of Companions of the Distinguished Service Order
 Lieutenants of the Royal Victorian Order
 Officers of the Order of the British Empire
 Wives of Lieutenants of the Royal Victorian Order
 Wives of Officers of the Order of the British Empire
 Companions of the Imperial Service Order
 Wives of Companions of the Imperial Service Order

Wives and daughters of peers, baronets, and knights, et al.

 Wives of the eldest sons of sons of peers or peeresses
 Daughters of sons of peers or peeresses
 Wives of the eldest sons of baronets
 Daughters of baronets
 Wives of eldest sons of knights:
 Knights of the Garter
 Knights of the Thistle
 Knights of St Patrick
 Knights Grand Cross or Grand Commander
 Knights Commander
 Daughters of knights:
 Daughters of Knights of the Garter
 Daughters of Knights of the Thistle
 Daughters of Knights Grand Cross or Grand Commander
 Daughters of Knights Commander
 Members of the Royal Victorian Order
 Members of the Order of the British Empire
 Wives of members of the Royal Victorian Order
 Wives of members of the Order of the British Empire

Wives of younger sons

 Wives of younger sons of baronets
 Wives of younger sons of knights:
 Knights of the Garter
 Knights of the Thistle
 Knights of St Patrick
 Knights Grand Cross or Knights Grand Commander
 Knights Commander

Notes

References

England and Wales
England and Wales